, known as The Drumstick Killer, was a Japanese cult leader and serial killer, responsible for six murders in Sukagawa City between 1994 and 1995.

A self-professed guru who claimed to have psychic abilities, she killed several of her cult members during bizarre rituals involving taiko sticks. For her crimes, she was sentenced to death and subsequently executed in 2012.

Murders and arrest 
From December 1994 to June 1995, Eto's followers, consisting of her daughter Yuko (23), Hiroshi Nemoto (21) and Mitsuo Sekine (45), assisted in killing the "ugly devils". In particular, Nemoto helped her in killing the six victims, as well as the injury of one female cult member.

On July 5, the Fukushima Prefectural Police decided to search Eto's house after the hospitalization of one cult member. They found six rotting corpses, and arrested Sachiko and her three followers. Later, the surviving victim was also arrested upon discovery that she had participated in the assault.

The victims included Hiroshi's wife, male follower J., J.'s wife and daughter, male follower K. and female follower N.

Trial 

 In March 1997, the Sendai High Court handed a 3-year sentence to the surviving cult member, including a 5-year suspended sentence (it's unknown if the decision was appealed).
 On November 16, 2001, the Fukushima District Court requested a death sentence for Sachiko Eto, life imprisonment for Yuko Eto and Mitsuo Sekine, and 20 years' imprisonment for Hiroshi Nemoto.
 On May 10, 2002, all the sentences were affirmed, but Nemoto's sentence was reduced to 18 years. Shingo Takahashi and Assistant Professor of Psychiatry Daidai Toho, the representative directors of the Japan De-Carte Association, analyzed the trial in the same fashion as those of the Aum Shinrikyo.
 On November 11, 2003, the Sendai High Court dismisses appeals for diminished sentences by the conspirators.
 On November 12, 2005, Sachiko Eto's appeal was also rejected by the Sendai High Court.
 On September 16, 2008, her appeal was officially dismissed by the Supreme Court of Japan, thus confirming Eto's death sentence. She was the 10th female prisoner to be sentenced to death after the war.
 On September 17, 2012, Sachiko Eto was executed in Miyagi Prison, in Sendai. She was the first woman executed in 15 years, and the fourth-in-line starting from 1950.

See also 
 Kitsune
 Lynching
 Stockholm syndrome
 Cult
 List of executions in Japan
 List of serial killers by country

References 

1947 births
1994 murders in Japan
1995 murders in Japan
2012 deaths
21st-century executions by Japan
Crimes involving Satanism or the occult
Cult leaders
Executed Japanese female serial killers
Executed Japanese women
Japanese people convicted of murder
Japanese religious leaders
July 1995 events in Asia
People convicted of murder by Japan
People executed by Japan by hanging
People from Sukagawa